Bratkowski (feminine: Bratkowska; plural: Bratkowscy) is a Polish-language surname. Also: Bratkowsky, Bratkovski, Bratkovsky. Notable people with the surname include:

 Arkadiusz Bratkowski (born 1959), Polish politician
 Bob Bratkowski (born 1955), American football coach and player, son of Zeke
 Jan Bratkowski (born 1975), German racing cyclist
 Katarzyna Bratkowska (born 1972), Polish literary critic and activist
 Michael Bratkowski, cinematographer
 Stefan Bratkowski (1934–2021), Polish writer and activist
 Zeke Bratkowski (1931–2019), American football player, father of Bob

See also
 

Polish-language surnames
de:Bratkowski
pl:Bratkowski